James Horan is an American character actor.

History 

Horan has appeared in many television programs and films. He has starred in several soap operas, including Guiding Light as Detective Kirk Winters in 1980–1981, Another World as Denny Hobson (1981–1982), General Hospital as Brett Madison (1985–1987), and All My Children as Creed Kelly (1988–1989). In 1982, Horan subbed for Larkin Malloy who had been injured in a car accident, playing Sky Whitney on The Edge of Night while Malloy recuperated. Years later, Horan originated the role of Clay Alden on Loving, playing that part from 1989 to 1991. When the role was recast several years later, Malloy assumed the role.

Horan also appeared in four of the Star Trek spin-off series. He appeared twice in Star Trek: The Next Generation in 1993, first in the episode "Suspicions", and later in the episode "Descent, Part II". In 1997, he appeared on Star Trek: Voyager in the episode "Fair Trade" and on Star Trek: Deep Space Nine n the episodes "In Purgatory's Shadow" and "By Inferno's Light". Horan had a recurring role in the first two seasons of Star Trek: Enterprise as the enigmatic figure whom fans called "Future Guy".

Horan's television guest appearances include roles on Werewolf, Remington Steele, Zorro, Melrose Place, Lost and Highlander: The Series. He appeared on a season 6 episode of 24.

In addition to his television and film work, Horan has provided voices for several video games, including several Star Trek and Star Wars games. He also provided the voice for the antagonist Skull Face in Metal Gear Solid V: The Phantom Pain. In 2012, he appeared as the sheriff in commercials for 5-hour Energy.

Filmography

Film 

 An Old Man's Gold – Monte
 Chattanooga Choo Choo – Mason

 Flags of Our Fathers – NYC Reporter
 Scanner Cop – Melvin
 Sunset Bar – Victor
 The Visitation – Tall Man

Television 

 All My Children – Creed Kelly
 Another World – Denny Hobson
 Criminal Minds – Mark Davis (Episode: "No Way Out")
 Dynasty – Maxwell Allen (Episode: "The Secret")
 General Hospital – Brett Madison
 Guiding Light – Detective Kirk Winters
 Highlander: The Series – Grayson (Episode: "Band of Brothers")
 Hunter – Savarino
 Melrose Place – Kimberly's Attorney (Episode: "Blind Ambition")
 Romance Theatre – Jake Jordan
 Loving – Clay Alden #1
 Remington Steele – Jeff (Episode: "Red Holt Steele")
 The Commish – Hector Bolchek (Episode: "Sleep of the Just")
 The Dukes of Hazzard – Garrett (Episode: "Farewell, Hazzard")
 The Edge of Night – Schuyler "Sky" Whitney
 The Young and the Restless – Mystery Man
 Werewolf – Ray (Episode: "Blood Ties")
 Zorro – Don Gilberto Risendo

Video games 

 Ace Combat: Assault Horizon – President Hamilton
 Baldur's Gate II: Shadows of Amn – Lord Logan Coprith, Grand Dule Belt, Kayl
 F.E.A.R. 3 – Additional voices
 Kingdoms of Amalur: Reckoning – Additional voices

References

External links 
Official website

American male film actors
American male soap opera actors
American male television actors
American male voice actors
American male video game actors
Living people
20th-century American male actors
21st-century American male actors
Year of birth missing (living people)